Eagle House is a Grade One Listed Queen Anne house built in the Dutch style. It is on London Road, Mitcham, in the London Borough of Merton, the grounds forming a triangle bounded by London Road, Bond Road and Western Road.

The building dates back to 1705, having been commissioned by the Marrano doctor Fernando Mendes (1647–1724), former physician to Charles II, and in whose family it remained for three generations.

Following the death in 1821 of the last private occupant—the widow of City banker John Bond—the property was converted into a private boarding school for young gentlemen (presumably nearby Bond Road reflects the Bond connection).

In the early days of the Holborn Union Industrial Schools, built in the northern part of the estate, it served as the school infirmary.

In 1933, the building was bought by the Surrey County Council, for the care of 'mentally deficient girls'.

Since 2005, the building has been a school for children and young people with autism.

References

Local newspaper, Mitcham News & Mercury, dated 16 June 1933, under the Mitcham Odds and Ends heading.

Houses completed in 1705
History of Surrey
Grade I listed houses in London
Houses in the London Borough of Merton
1705 establishments in England
Country houses in London